La Virgen is a district of the Sarapiquí canton, in the Heredia province of Costa Rica.

Geography 
La Virgen has an area of  km² and an elevation of  metres.

It presents a mountainous territory in its south end whereas in north direction the land goes down and ends in the plains of Sarapiquí.

Location 

It is located in the northern region of the country and borders the districts of Cureña to the north, Varablanca de Heredia to the south, Puerto Viejo and Horquetas to the east. While to the west it borders with the province of Alajuela.

Its head, the town of La Virgen, is located 16.4 km (18 minutes) to the south of Puerto Viejo and 78.6 km (2 hours 9 minutes) to the N of San José, the nation's capital.

Demographics 

For the 2011 census, La Virgen had a population of  inhabitants. 

In this case, it is the third most populated area of the canton, behind  Puerto Viejo y de  Horquetas.

Settlements
The 31 population centers in the district are:

La Virgen (head of the district)
Ángeles
Arbolitos (parte)
Bajos de Chilamate
Boca Sardinal
Bosque
Búfalo
Delicias
El Uno
Esquipulas
Las Palmitas
Laquí
Lomas
Llano Grande
Magsaysay
Masaya
Medias (parte)
Pangola
Pozo Azul
Quebrada Grande
Río Magdaleno
Roble
San Gerardo (parte)
San Isidro
San José Sur
San Ramón
La Delia
Sardinal
Tirimbina
Vega de Sardinal (parte)
Venados

Economy 

The extensive export-oriented pineapple is one of the foundations of the local economy.

The Virgin, its head, has health services, education, lodging and entertainment in recreational areas.

Tourism has an important presence in which the activities of wildlife observation and rafting tours in the Sarapiquí River stand out.

As for the trade, it emphasizes the sale of fast foods, groceries, shoes, clothes, appliances and souvenirs.

Transportation

Road transportation 
The district is covered by the following road routes:
 National Route 4
 National Route 126
 National Route 506
 National Route 745

References 

Districts of Heredia Province
Populated places in Heredia Province